Kathleen Flenniken (born October 30, 1960) is an American writer, poet, editor, and educator. In 2012, she was named the Poet Laureate of Washington. She has been honored with a 2012 Pushcart Prize, as well as fellowships with the Artist Trust (Washington State Arts Commission), and the National Endowment for the Arts. Her collection of poetry titled Famous, received the 2005 Prairie Schooner Book Prize in Poetry. Her following work, Plume, was honored with the 2013 Washington State Book Award.

Personal background 
Kathleen (née Dillon) Flenniken was born on October 30, 1960 in Richland, Washington. She is the daughter of Robert and Kathleen (née Melville) Dillon. Her father was a PhD Chemist, working at the Hanford Nuclear Reservation in southeastern Washington state. In 1978, she graduated from Columbia High School. In 1983, she earned a Bachelor of Science in Civil Engineering from Washington State University. In 1986, she moved to Seattle, where she earned a Master of Science in Civil Engineering in 1988 from the University of Washington. In 2007, she earned a Masters of Fine Arts degree in Creative Writing from Pacific Lutheran University. In 1986, she married Steve Flenniken. They have three children.

Professional background 
Writing
Her collection of poetry titled Famous, received the 2005 Prairie Schooner Book Prize in Poetry. In 2007, the work was named a Notable Book by the American Library Association. In 2012, the University of Washington Press published her second book of poetry, titled Plume. The work was honored with the 2013 Washington State Book Award. It was also a finalist for the 2013 Pacific Northwest Booksellers Association Award and the William Carlos Williams Award, presented by the Poetry Society of America. In 2012, she was named one of Seattle Magazine's Spotlight Award winners, while the following year, she was named a Distinguished Visiting Poet at Seattle University.

In 2012, she was named the Washington State Poet Laureate, which is recognized through 2014. As poet laureate, she reaches out to students throughout the state. She teaches poetry through an affiliation with arts agencies, including Writers in the Schools and the Jack Straw Foundation. In addition to her writing, Flenniken has worked as an engineer and hydrologist (three projects at the Hanford Nuclear Reservation). , she lives in the Seattle area, where she is the president and editor of the Floating Bridge Press, which focuses on publishing the creative works of Washington State poets. She is also the president of a nonprofit media arts studio and cultural center known as Jack Straw Foundation.

Honors and awards 
 2003: Artist Trust (Washington State Arts Commission) Literature Fellowship
 2005: National Endowment for the Arts Literary Fellowship in Poetry
 2005: Prairie Schooner Book Prize in Poetry for Famous
 2007: American Library Association Notable Book Award for Famous
 2007: Washington State Book Award for Famous (finalist)
 2012: Pushcart Prize for "Horse Latitudes"<ref>Henderson, Bill; The Pushcart Prize Editors (2011). The Pushcart Prize XXXVI: Best of the Small Presses (2012 Edition), Pushcart Press, page 57. </ref>
 2012: Seattle Magazine "Spotlight Award"
 2012: Washington State Poet Laureate (2012–2014 term)
 2013: Washington State Book Award for Plume 2013: Pacific Northwest Booksellers Association Award for Plume (finalist)
 2013: William Carlos Williams Award – Poetry Society of America for Plume (finalist)

 Published works 
Books
 Flenniken, Kathleen (2006). Famous, (Prairie Schooner Book Prize in Poetry), Bison Books, 76 pages. 
 Flenniken, Kathleen (2012). Plume'', (Pacific Northwest Poetry Series), University of Washington Press, 80 pages.

References

External links 
 

1960 births
Poets Laureate of Washington (state)
Living people
University of Washington College of Engineering alumni
Pacific Lutheran University alumni
Washington State University alumni
American women poets
People from Richland, Washington
21st-century American poets
21st-century American women writers